Máximo González was the defending champion from the last edition of the tournament in 2009. He reached the final, where he defeated Éric Prodon 7–5, 0–6, 6–2.

Seeds

Draw

Finals

Top half

Bottom half

References
 Main Draw
 Qualifying Draw

Cachantun Cup - Singles
2011 - Singles